Matilda Gogo Lambert is a Nigerian actress, movie producer, model, and CEO of Tilda Goes Green Foundation. She made her movie debut in the film The Celebrities alongside Mike Ezuruonye. Her performance in the movie brought her to prominence and earned her leading roles in other Nollywood movies.

Early life and education 
Matilda Gogo Lambert was born on 13 April and raised in Port Harcourt. She is from Andoni LGA, Rivers State. Lambert received early education at Police Children Primary School and had her secondary education at the Federal Government Girl's College, Abuloma in Port Harcourt. She studied at the University of Abuja for a bachelor's degree in Philosophy and later earned a master's degree in Socio-Political Philosophy from the University of Nigeria, Nsukka.

Career 
Lambert began her acting career in her second year in the university when she featured in the film The Celebrity alongside Mike Ezuruonye. Her performance in the movie brought her to limelight and began starring in other movies. In 2020, she produced a movie, Unroyal in which she starred in the leading role as Princess Boma. The movie premiered in March 2020 and was released on Netflix in August same year. At the 2020  Best of Nollywood (BON) Awards, The movie won award in two categories of “Best use of Costume in a Movie” and “Movie with the Best Sound”. Her other productions as of 2022 include Deepest Cut, Instaguru and Kendra. She is managed by Adenekan Mayowa.

Filmography 

 Unroyal
 The Celebrities
 My Best Friend
 From House Girl to Madam
 My Virginity
 Amanda

References 

Nigerian film actresses
Nigerian film producers
Actresses from Rivers State
University of Abuja alumni
University of Nigeria alumni
Year of birth missing (living people)
Living people
Nigerian chief executives
Nigerian female models
Nigerian women film producers
People from Rivers State
21st-century Nigerian actresses
Nigerian philanthropists